Kihei is a census-designated place (CDP) in Maui County, Hawaii, United States. The population was 21,423 at the 2020 census.

Geography
Kihei is located at  (20.759122, −156.457228).

It is considered to be the South Side of Maui, located on the leeward side of Haleakala.

Landmarks and locations
Although its official city designation is Wailuku, the Kihei Junction Park and Ride lot is a frequently-used commuter parking lot at the corner of highway 310 (North Kihei Road) and highway 30 (Honoapi'ilani Highway) at coordinates 20.8099479,-156.51417 There is no public bus service that stops here; however, it is located near Ma 'alaea Harbor Village, where there is a public transportation stop. It's primarily used for hikers, bicyclists and ride sharers looking for a meeting place that is centrally located between Kihei, Lahaina and Wailuku. There's no charge to park; the lot is unattended.

Demographics

As of the census of 2000, there were 16,749 people, 6,170 households, and 3,813 families residing in the CDP. The racial makeup of the CDP was 47.76% White, 6.74% African American, 0.48% Native American, 24.72% Asian, 7.85% Pacific Islander, 1.58% from other races, and 16.87% from two or more races. Hispanic or Latino of any race were 1.52% of the population.

There were 6,170 households, out of which 32.0% had children under the age of 18 living with them, 45.7% were married couples living together, 10.6% had a female householder with no husband present, and 38.2% were non-families. 25.7% of all households were made up of individuals, and 4.0% had someone living alone who was 65 years of age or older.  The average household size was 2.70 and the average family size was 3.31.

In the CDP the population was spread out, with 25.1% under the age of 18, 8.1% from 18 to 24, 36.2% from 25 to 44, 23.6% from 45 to 64, and 7.0% who were 65 years of age or older.  The median age was 35 years. For every 100 females, there were 103.1 males.  For every 100 females age 18 and over, there were 103.3 males.

The median income for a household in the CDP was $46,215, and the median income for a family was $50,738. Males had a median income of $33,229 versus $26,881 for females. The per capita income for the CDP was $21,591.  About 7.0% of families and 10.1% of the population were below the poverty line, including 8.8% of those under age 18 and 5.1% of those age 65 or over.

Attractions
The Kihei Aquatic Center hosts swim meets and other aquatic activities.

Research
Several research facilities are located in Kihei, including the main offices for the Hawaiian Islands Humpback Whale National Marine Sanctuary, seed operations by Bayer Crop Science, and the Maui Research and Technology Park, which is home to the Maui High Performance Computing Center (MHPCC), and the Pacific Disaster Center and is overseen by the Air Force Maui Optical and Supercomputing observatory (AMOS).

Economy
Major employers in Kihei include Safeway, Monsanto, the Hawai'i Department of Education, the Kihei Canoe Club, Keller Williams Realty Maui, Goodfellow Bros., Fred's Mexican Cafe, and NextHome Pacific Properties.

Namesakes
University of Virginia basketball player and NCAA Division I champion Kihei Clark was named for Kihei, where his father proposed to his mother.

Gallery

References

External links

Census-designated places in Maui County, Hawaii
Populated places on Maui
Populated coastal places in Hawaii